Occupy Edinburgh was a protest against economic and social inequality as part of the global Occupy movement. The "occupation" began with the erection of a number of tents in St. Andrew Square on 14 October 2011.

On 24 November 2011, Edinburgh City Council became the first governmental body in the world to grant both the Occupy Edinburgh and the worldwide Occupy Movement official recognition.

In January 2012 the protesters were urged to leave their site by Essential Edinburgh, the business group that manages the square they were occupying, and the Edinburgh Chamber of Commerce, so that it can be used by the public again. The Chamber's deputy chief executive, Graham Birse, said: "We did not spend all that public money for St Andrew Square to become a campsite for those with nowhere else to go."

At the end of January 2012 the protesters relocated to The Meadows, a park within Edinburgh, and then left this site a couple of weeks later ahead of a legal bid to have them evicted by the City Council.

See also
 15 October 2011 global protests
 List of global Occupy movement protest locations
 "Occupy" protests
 Timeline of Occupy Wall Street
 We are the 99%

References

External links
 Occupy Edinburgh

2011 in Scotland
Edinburgh
Protests in Scotland
Squatting in Scotland